Oplurus quadrimaculatus, the Duméril's Madagascar Swift or Madagascar spotted spiny-tailed iguana, is a terrestrial malagasy iguana belonging to the family Opluridae.

Description
This iguana is greyish, with a spotted back and tail and legs covered with enlarged, spinous scales. It spends hours basking in sunlight. It is mainly insectivorous. Mating lasts just a few seconds and the eggs are laid in sheltered areas.

Distribution
This species is endemic to Madagascar.

Habitat
Madagascar spotted spiny-tailed iguana lives on loamy slopes, clay expanses and large rocks in various environment, from the arid regions  in dry spiny forests to northern wetlands and humid areas close to the rainforest and in shrubland.

Gallery

References
Duméril & Duméril, 1851 : Catalogue méthodique de la collection des reptiles du Muséum d'Histoire Naturelle de Paris. Gide et Baudry/Roret, Paris, p. 1-224

External links
Biolib
The IUCN Red List
The Reptile Database
Iguane à queue épineuse de Madagascar

Oplurus
Reptiles of Madagascar
Endemic fauna of Madagascar
Reptiles described in 1851